Wadi el-Hol  is a valley on the Farshut Road, north-west of Luxor on the Qena Bend, situated on the west bank of the river Nile in Egypt. Rock inscriptions in the valley appear to show the oldest examples of phonetic alphabetic writing discovered to date.

History
In 1993, American egyptologists Deborah Darnell and her then husband John Darnell found letters in two single-line rock inscriptions carved into limestone cliffs in the Wadi el-Hol valley. They returned to the site for several seasons through the 1990s to further study the inscriptions. In 1999, they finally published their research, concluding that they had found the earliest surviving alphabet, dating back to around 1800 to 1900 BCE. In particular, the inscriptions appear to resemble the Proto-Sinaitic script from Serabit el-Khadem.

See also
Theban Desert Road Survey
Patterns of Evidence
Proto-Sinaitic script
Serabit el-Khadim
Writing system

References

Further reading

External links
 WADI EL-HOL by John Darnell – UCLA Encyclopedia of Egyptology

Linguistics